Bagno  is a village in the administrative district of Gmina Oborniki Śląskie, within Trzebnica County, Lower Silesian Voivodeship, in south-western Poland.

The 18th century Bagno Palace today is home to a seminary of the Salvatorian order.

References

Bagno
Palaces in Poland